USS Bourbon was a frigate in the Continental Navy, named for the House of Bourbon.

During the American Revolutionary War, Bourbon was authorized as a 36-gun frigate by the Continental Congress 23 January 1777. Very little else is known about it, but it may have been  built at Chatham, Connecticut.  Due to the Congress's financial difficulties,  it was not launched until 31 July 1783. In September 1783, still uncompleted, it was offered for sale and presumably sold.

References 

Ships of the Continental Navy
Ships built in Connecticut
1783 ships